Marcos Luis Ondo Mangue (born 13 August 2000) is an Equatorial Guinean footballer who plays as a goalkeeper for Moldovan club FC Dinamo-Auto Tiraspol and the Equatorial Guinea national team.

Club career
Ondo has played for Cano Sport Academy in Equatorial Guinea.

International career
Ondo made his international debut for Equatorial Guinea on 4 August 2019.

References

External links

2000 births
Living people
Sportspeople from Malabo
Equatoguinean footballers
Association football goalkeepers
Cano Sport Academy players
FC Dinamo-Auto Tiraspol players
Equatorial Guinea international footballers
Equatoguinean expatriate footballers
Equatoguinean expatriate sportspeople in Spain
Expatriate footballers in Spain
Expatriate footballers in Moldova